(born 28 February 1953) is a Japanese monk and garden designer. He is chief priest of the Sōtō Zen temple Kenkō-ji (建功寺), professor at Tama Art University, and president of a design firm that has completed numerous projects in Japan and overseas. He has been called "Japan's leading garden designer".

Career
Shunmyō Masuno was born in Yokohama as the eldest child of the 17th chief priest of Kenkō-ji. After graduating in 1975 from the Faculty of Agriculture of Tamagawa University he continued an apprenticeship in garden design under Katsuo Saitō, who had designed the garden at his father's temple. From 1979 he underwent Zen training at Sōji-ji, one of the two head temples of the Sōtō school. He founded Japanese Landscape Consultants, his garden design firm, in 1982. He became chief priest of Kenkō-ji in 2000.

Since the 1980s he has lectured at universities such as Cornell, University of London, and Harvard. He is a professor in the Department of Environmental Design at Tama Art University since 1998, and has also taught at the University of British Columbia. Through his firm, he has designed dozens of gardens throughout Japan and around the world. They include traditional designs such as the Japanese garden at Berlin's Erholungspark Marzahn park as well as strikingly contemporary designs such as the karesansui garden at the Canadian Embassy in Tokyo.

Philosophy
When designing a garden, Masuno first meditates and establishes a dialog with the space. This requires an emptying of the self in order to "hear" the elements of the garden speak. In discussions with the philosopher Koji Tanaka, he explained his perspective on the ethics of gardening, saying that gardening brings about a gentleness in the designer, builder, and caretakers. The garden teaches the suchness or intrinsic value of each thing, the connectedness, harmony, tranquility, and sacredness of the everyday. Developing a sense of respect for all things is no small step in becoming an ethical human being, both with respect to other humans and the environment at large.

Selected publications

Notes

References

External links
 Japan Landscape Consultants official site
  Lexnews magazine Interview of Shunmyō Masuno (french and english versions)

1953 births
Soto Zen Buddhists
Zen Buddhist priests
Japanese Zen Buddhists
Japanese landscape architects
Living people
People from Kanagawa Prefecture
People from Yokohama